Kalyanaratne Hemachandra (died 6 July 1962) was a Ceylonese planter, merchant and politician.

In January 1948 he was elected as one of the inaugural members of the Talawakelle - Lindula Urban Council, a position he retained until his death in 1962. 

At the 3rd parliamentary elections, held on 5 April 1956, Hemachandra ran as the United National Party candidate in the Talawakelle electorate. He received 1,720 votes (52% of the total vote) defeating the Sri Lanka Freedom Party candidate, Edmund Wanigasekera, by 160 votes.

References 

Date of birth missing
1962 deaths
Local authority councillors of Sri Lanka
Members of the 3rd Parliament of Ceylon
Sinhalese politicians
United National Party politicians